The 1976 NCAA Division II Lacrosse Championship was the third annual single-elimination tournament to determine the national champions of NCAA Division II men's college lacrosse in the United States.

The championship game was played at UMBC Stadium at the University of Maryland, Baltimore County in Catonsville, Maryland. 

After losing in the final the prior two seasons, Hobart defeated Adelphi, 19−9, to win their first national title.

The Statesmen (14–3) were coached by Jerry Schmidt.

Bracket

See also
NCAA Division I Men's Lacrosse Championship
NCAA Division III Men's Lacrosse Championship (from 1980)
NCAA Division II Women's Lacrosse Championship (from 2001)

References

NCAA Division II Men's Lacrosse Championship
NCAA Division II Men's Lacrosse Championship
NCAA Division I Men's Lacrosse